Müstakimler is a village in the Bolu District, Bolu Province, Turkey. Its population is 73 (2021). It is located about 15 km North East of the City of Bolu.

References

Villages in Bolu District